Sreebala K Menon is a Malayali author and filmmaker who won the 2005 Kerala Sahitya Akademi Award -'Best Humor writing '- for her book 19, Canal Road. She has published a collection of short stories named 'Slyviaplathinte Masterpiece'  by Mathrubhumi Books.
Love 24x7, her debut movie in Malayalam won her Kerala State Film Award and Ramu Kariat Award. (Best debutant director 2015)
She is married to Jimmy James ;Senior News Editor;Asianet News.

Education
Sreebala has done her post-graduation in English literature from Madras University . She got trained in science and development communication at C-DIT, Trivandrum.

Film career
Sreebala K. menon has directed the film Love 24x7, Starring Dileep and debutante Nikhila Vimal in lead roles while Suhasini, Sashi Kumar, Lena and Sreenivasan plays the supporting roles. Love 24x7 is a romantic comedy film written by Sreebala herself. The movie won her Kerala State Film award and Ramu Kariat award for best debutant director 2015 .Sreebala's 20-minute short film in 2009 Panthibhojanam, received good reviews for its take on caste. The theme of the film draws on different ideas of food; shared food between friends, food that is untouchable for one caste, but a delicacy for another, and the food of the community feast that can be collectively cooked and eaten. Her short film Journey from Darkness to Light won third prize at the Ability Fest 2005. Menon worked with director Sathyan Anthikad on many movies.

Controversy
In 28 April 2004, Sreebala approached the State Women's Commission (SWC) against the residents' association office-bearers of her flat complex, alleging that they have been intruding into her personal life to the point of harassment. The complaint was filed jointly by the owner of the flat, Dr J. Devika, a researcher at the Centre for Development Studies and Ms. Menon to whom she had let out the flat. Since she was single woman, visitors to her flat were asked to jot down their names in a book, which she considered to be a breach of her privacy.

This incident sparked off a debate on the right to privacy of the tenant and the problems faced by working women when they search for accommodation. V. Shantaram, director, State Women's Commission, said on the issue that  "We shall initiate appropriate action. The Constitution also provides special protection to women and any sort of physical or verbal harassment can be brought to the notice of the police officials. No woman should tolerate such unfair treatment."

Filmography
 Journey from Darkness to Light (2005) – Short Film
 Panthibhojanam (2009) – Short Film
 Love 24x7 (2015) – Debutant Movie

References 

Kerala state film awards 2015

External links 
 

Film directors from Thiruvananthapuram
Living people
Malayalam-language writers
Malayalam film directors
Indian women film directors
21st-century Indian women writers
21st-century Indian dramatists and playwrights
Screenwriters from Thiruvananthapuram
Women writers from Kerala
Indian women screenwriters
Year of birth missing (living people)
21st-century Indian screenwriters
Recipients of the Kerala Sahitya Akademi Award